The Oneida County Courthouse is a three-story, copper-domed county courthouse located in Rhinelander, Wisconsin. It houses the circuit court and government offices of Oneida County, Wisconsin. The building was listed on the National Register of Historic Places in 1981 and on the State Register of Historic Places in 1989 for its significance as a local example of Neoclassical architecture.

History

The courthouse was built in 1908 to a replace a timber frame courthouse that had stood on the same site from 1887-1908. The 1908 courthouse was designed by German-born architect Christ H. Tegen of Manitowoc, who had designed the similar Manitowoc County Courthouse two years earlier. The rear of the building has been expanded several times over the century to provide additional space for county government.

Design

The exterior of the courthouse consists of gray limestone ashlar walls, which are rusticated on the first story. The north, west, and south facades feature Ionic columns spanning from the second to the third story. The building is topped with an octagonal stained glass and copper dome. The dome is nearly identical to that of the Grant County, Wisconsin Courthouse, except that the latter uses clear glass.

The courthouse interior includes a three story light well beneath the stained-glass dome. The four spandrels of the dome are decorated with identical mosaics depicting eagles. There are three murals on the third floor. Two murals painted in 1919 by Franz Biberstein depict romanticized impressions of the area's early fur trading and lumber rafting history. The third, anonymous mural depicts the Hodag creature of local legend.

The grounds of the courthouse include a marble war memorial and various commemorative markers related to local history.

References

Courthouses on the National Register of Historic Places in Wisconsin
National Register of Historic Places in Oneida County, Wisconsin
Neoclassical architecture in Wisconsin
Government buildings completed in 1910
1910 establishments in Wisconsin